KVOR (740 AM, "AM 740 KVOR") is a commercial radio station in Colorado Springs, Colorado, serving Colorado Springs and Pueblo.  It is owned by Cumulus Media and airs a news/talk radio format.

KVOR is powered at 3,300 watts by day.  But because AM 740 is a clear-channel frequency reserved for Class A CFZM Toronto, KVOR must reduce power at night to 1,500 watts to avoid interference.  It uses a directional antenna at all times, with a north-south pattern that covers Pueblo, even though the station's transmitter is located north of downtown Colorado Springs, near Thompson Road.  Studios and offices are located on Corporate Drive in Colorado Springs.

The KVOR weekday schedule begins with Colorado Springs' Morning News followed by a local late morning talk show hosted by Richard Randall.  The rest of the weekday line up is made up of nationally syndicated talk shows:  The Dan Bongino Show, The Ben Shapiro Show, The Mark Levin Show, Ground Zero with Clyde Lewis, The Chris Plante Show, Red Eye Radio and America in the Morning.  Weekends feature shows on money, food, computers, law and religion including Bill Handel on the Law and The Jesus Christ Show with Neil Saavedra.   KVOR partners with local TV station KOAA (an NBC TV Network affiliate) for news and weather coverage.  Most hours begin with world and national news from ABC News Radio.

KVOR broadcasts the Air Force Falcons football and basketball games.

History
In order to provide extended coverage to the growing Colorado Springs and Pueblo media markets, in 2000 KVOR switched frequencies with sister station 740 KTWK.  KVOR continued its news-talk format on AM 740 while AM 1300 became adult standards outlet KTWK, carrying the Music of Your Life radio network.  (Today it is CBS Sports Radio station KCSF.)

KVOR's transmitter was temporarily offline during the 2013 Black Forest Fire.  The station was known previously as "News/Talk 740," "Newsradio 740," and most recently "Colorado Springs' Talk Station."

References

External links
KVOR Official site

FCC History Cards for KVOR

VOR
News and talk radio stations in the United States
Cumulus Media radio stations
Radio stations established in 1955
1955 establishments in Colorado
Air Force Falcons football
Air Force Falcons men's basketball